is a drifting driver from Japan, formerly competing in D1 Grand Prix, well known for using the Nissan Silvia S15. He is also known as Waku Waku and Spin Benz Dokan.

Biography
Kazama was first introduced to drifting at age 17 when he watched Gengo Kitagawa, who later became his spotter and mentor, drifting on a touge. As soon as he got his driving licence he began drifting in his Toyota Corolla Levin AE86 with the proceeds of his job in a filling station. He later escaped death when his car slid down underneath a crash barrier and fell 30 feet down the mountain. He was originally a mechanic and sponsor driver for "Kei-Office" until 31 August 2005, when he left the company to start up his own shop called Rodextyle but he continued to support Tsuchiya's company as the sponsor driver for his new company DG-5 until 2007 which he eventually retired from competition drifting to focus on Rodextyle.

He was formerly known as Spin Benz Dokan due to an incident that happened after the 2001 D1GP season finals in Nikko, when Sunpros had filmed a 'Team Drift' segment for the Drift Heaven series and involved hitting a then-D1 Driver Toru Maruyama's daily Mercedes Benz.  He was later known as Waku Waku Kun or Rodeo Clown due to his reputation as a clown within the series and being well known for his Rodeo Drift, a form of doughnutting by sitting on the driver's door of the car which he first practiced at the Big-X events, then later at D1GP pre-tsuisou rounds warm-ups in 2005 when he changed the side windows of his car to make it possible to perform the trick.

Kazama is also known in the United Kingdom for his only mainstream TV appearance outside Japan in the BBC2 show Top Gear, in which he teaches Richard Hammond drifting in a stock Vauxhall Monaro VX-R. As with the rising popularity of the drifting scene there, he has since made two appearances in both Autocar in April 2006, driving a Caterham Seven and February 2007 issue of the Octane.

Drifting career
He made a name for himself in drifting contests throughout the 90s, driving a Nissan Silvia S13, Toyota Mark II JZX90, and a Nissan Silvia S14. In 1994, he placed 3rd overall for Young Version's STCC (Super Technic Challenge Cup) event, a yearly single-run competition series that was judged by Keiichi Tsuchiya and was held at Tsukuba Circuit as the series' main venue. In 1997, he won the Chubu Ikaten which took place at Rally Kids INA (INA Circuit) along with his team "Kazama Juku" winning the team class, he also won the STCC event of that year. In 1998, he won the one-make S14 drift champion contest hosted by Manabu Orido and Video Option which took place at Sportsland Sugo's Kart course. In 2000, he won the 2nd Ikaten Superstar Drift Battle held at Ebisu Circuit's South course which was held in April. 26th, 2000. He became one of the first drivers to use an S15 for drifting but was heavily in debt until his patience paid off when he was sponsored by Tsuchiya to be the driver for Kei-Office, whom he also worked for as a mechanic.

 D1 Grand Prix
From when he first started in the D1GP series at the end of 2000, he had moderate success, but when he teamed up with Gengo, things started to pay off. He ran his personal S15 until Kei-Office debuted a blue S15 at the Final Round in Nikko, which the car was being worked on throughout the 2001 season and was also continued to be used for the 2002 and 2003 season.

In 2002, he managed to earn the runner-up spot at 2nd round in Ebisu Circuit against Nobuteru Taniguchi. Onwards, however, he was unable to get past through the qualifying runs which ended up with him being ranked 17th overall.

In 2003, the Kei-Office team had debuted a new track-spec S15 at the 4th round in Fuji Speedway which wore the company's signature jade green, Prodrive GC-06D rims and a new 2003-spec original brand body kit (now under Rodextyle) as the previous kit was co-produced by Behrman/Wisesquare. He still had moderate success especially taking the runner-up spot once again at Round 5 in Ebisu. He was ranked 12th overall.

In 2004, this was marked as a start to a successful season for him as he won his first event at the season opener in Irwindale, it was an important pinpoint since he's a veteran drifter within the Japanese drifting community. At the championship round finale, Kei-Office once again debuted another S15 which was previously the company's 2002 season car, with the main focuses of a stricter setup than the previous car by the use of Driftmaster rims, an HKS 2.2L stroker kit setup by Auto Produce Boss, Speed Glass lightweight windows, and utilizing a Holinger sequential transmission. The car was later reused for the 2005 and 2006 seasons. The 2003-spec S15 was used only for international events throughout 2005 until the car was exported to Norway in 2007. He had a very steady season and was able to keep a seeded position. He was ranked 4th overall.

In 2005, he manages to win the season opener held at Irwindale once again. He also earned more victories at Sugo and Ebisu rounds to rack up his position as the series point leader. At the championship finale, he was crowned as the 2005 D1GP champion and earned the championship title by beating Masao Suenaga only by 1 point.

In 2006, he switched teams from Kei-Office to DG-5 with 2005 championship car having cosmetic changes, specifically with the Kei-Office aero being removed for GP Sports' G-Sonic Evolution kit. He manages to once again win the season opener in Irwindale, earning him a nickname that some would say, the 'Irwindale Meister'. The S15 remained green until it was later repainted to blue after DG-5 collaborated with Avex's M.O.V.E, starting in Round 2 onwards. He had a steady season earning a second win at the third round in Fuji and ranked 3rd overall, however, it would be the last season that he would compete in the D1 Grand Prix. He also earned a victory for the U.K. exhibition match in Silverstone Circuit with a T-car S15, later used by Hideo Hiraoka the following year along with other D1 drivers from 2008 on-wards. The 2005 championship car would later be used by Katsuhiro Ueo (2007), Youichi Imamura (2008-2011), Yoshinori Koguchi (2012-2013), and Shinji Minowa (2014).

Drifting results

D1 Grand Prix

References

Bibliography

External links
 DG-5: sponsor's site
 Rodextyle old official blog site.
 Rodextyle current official blog site.
 Rodexshop
 MSN Cars: How to drive sideways
D1 Supporter profile

Japanese racing drivers
Drifting drivers
1970 births
Living people
D1 Grand Prix drivers